Films produced in Norway in the 1970s:

1970s

External links
 Norwegian film at the Internet Movie Database

1970s
Norwegian
Films